Margaret Collier Graham (September 29, 1850 – January 17, 1910) was a short story writer in southern California at the beginning of the 20th century.

Early life, education and marriage
Margaret Collier grew up in Keokuk, Iowa.  She had two sisters and a brother.  In 1869, she graduated from Monmouth College (Illinois), where she had been active in its literary society.  After teaching for three years in Oskaloosa, Iowa, she married Donald McIntyre Graham whom she had known at college.  She settled with her husband, a young attorney, in Bloomingdale, Illinois, where they worked in an abstract of title business.  When Donald contracted tuberculosis, the Grahams and Margaret's sister Jennie Collier moved to Pasadena after brief stays in San Francisco and Anaheim.

Career in Pasadena
Once in Pasadena, Margaret took a teaching job and began writing stories for The Argonaut and The Californian.  In 1881, she took a two-month leave of absence to meet travel to Oakland where she met publishers, wrote stories and became acquainted with historian Theodore Hittell and poet Ina Coolbirth.
The Grahams and Margaret's brother Will Collier invested successfully in property near Lake Elsinore north east of San Diego, establishing the town of Wildomar in 1885.  Financially secure, the Grahams built Wynyate, a three story mansion in South Pasadena where they entertained the literary and civic leaders of the area.  Donald became mayor of South Pasadena in 1888. Margaret and Jennie established the South Pasadena Lyceum, a precursor of the South Pasadena Public Library, in 1889.  In 1890, Donald died of tuberculosis.

Later life
Margaret resumed writing in 1892 publishing striking short stories set in the American West in the Atlantic Monthly and Century Magazine. Her first collection of short stories was published by Houghton, Mifflin in 1895 as Stories of the Foot-hills.  Active in the intellectual and political scene, she was a popular speaker and worked for women's suffrage through the Woman's Parliament of Southern California and for the preservation of California missions through Charles Lummis' Landmarks Club.  She was a monthly columnist in Lummis' magazine Land of Sunshine.  Her second collection of short stories, The Wizard's Daughter and Other Stories was published in 1905, again by Houghton Mifflin.
Margaret Collier Graham died in 1910 at the age of 60.

References

Further reading
Margaret Collier Graham, Stories of the Foot-hills, 1895.
Margaret Collier Graham,The Wizard's Daughter, 1905.
Margaret Collier Graham, Do They Really Respect Us? and Other Essays, 1912.  A collection of her political and social articles.
Helen Raitt and Mary Collier Wayne, eds., We Three Came West: A True Chronicle, 1974.
Margaret Collier Graham, Sage Bloom and Water Rights: Stories of Early Southern California, Many Moon Press, Pasadena, 2095.

External links 

 

1850 births
1910 deaths
People from Van Buren County, Iowa
People from South Pasadena, California
Writers from California